Caldwell Parish School Board is a school district headquartered in Columbia, Louisiana, United States.

The district serves Caldwell Parish.

The four-day school week
The Caldwell Parish School Board decreased the school week to four days, with the permission of the superintendent the new shortened school week is planned to save this rural district about $135,000 per year.

School uniforms
The district requires all of its students to wear school uniforms.

Schools

Secondary schools
 Caldwell Parish High School (Unincorporated area)
 Caldwell Parish Junior High School (Unincorporated area)

Primary schools
 Columbia Elementary School (Columbia)
 Grayson Elementary School (Grayson)
 Kelly Elementary School (Unincorporated area)
 Union Central Elementary School (Unincorporated area)

Preschools
 Caldwell Parish Pre-School (Unincorporated area)

References

External links

School districts in Louisiana
Education in Caldwell Parish, Louisiana